Lori Rader-Day is an American author of mystery, crime, and suspense novels. She has won three Anthony Awards (2015, 2018, 2019), a Simon & Schuster Mary Higgins Clark Award (2016), and an Agatha Award for Best Historical Novel (2021).

Personal life and education 
Rader-Day was born in Thorntown, Indiana and currently lives in Chicago.

She received a Bachelor of Science degree from Ball State University, Master of Arts degree in creative nonfiction from Ball State University and a Master of Fine Arts degree in creative writing from Roosevelt University.

Career 
From 2019-2020, Rader-Day served as the national president for Sisters in Crime. She presently serves as the co-chair of the Midwest Mystery Conference.

Rader-Day also teaches creative writing for Northwestern University’s School of Professional Studies. She previously taught at Ball State University, Roosevelt University, and Yale University.

Awards and honors 
In 2017, Rader-Day won the Regional Award for the Indiana Authors Awards.

Publications 

 The Black Hour (2014)
 Little Pretty Things (2015)
 The Day I Died (2017)
 Under a Dark Sky (2018)
 The Lucky One (2020)
 Death at Greenway (2021)

References

External links 

 Official website

21st-century American women writers
Writers from Chicago
People from Thorntown, Indiana
Year of birth missing (living people)
Living people